The 1994–95 Élite Ligue season was the 74th season of the Élite Ligue, the top level of ice hockey in France. Eight teams participated in the league, and the Dragons de Rouen won their fifth league title.

Regular season

Playoffs

External links
Season on hockeyarchives.info

Fra
1994–95 in French ice hockey
Ligue Magnus seasons